Estadio Alfonso Murube is a football stadium in the autonomous city of Ceuta, Spain in Northern Africa. It is the home stadium of AD Ceuta FC, who currently play in Segunda División B - Group 4, with a capacity of 6,500 seats. The stadium was inaugurated with a match between Ceuta and Algeciras Club de Fútbol, with the home team winning 4–2.

Other events
On 16 April 2002, the stadium hosted a friendly between the Spain national under-21 football team coached by Iñaki Sáez and the Yugoslavia under-21 team. With star players José Antonio Reyes, Fernando Torres, Pepe Reina, Asier Del Horno, Javier Portillo, Mikel Arteta, Xabi Alonso, and Raúl Bravo making appearances, Spain defeated Yugoslavia 2–1 with goals from Reyes and Torres.

References

External links
 
Estadios de España 

Football venues in Spain
Estadio Alfonso Murube
Estadio Alfonso Murube
Sports venues completed in 1997
Estadio Alfonso Murube